Laura Harper may refer to:
 Laura Harper (cricketer)
 Laura Harper (basketball)